Andy Statman (born 1950) is a noted American klezmer clarinetist and bluegrass/newgrass mandolinist.

Life and career
Statman was born in New York City and grew up in the borough of Queens. Beginning at age 12, he learned to play banjo and guitar, following the example of his older brother Jimmy, and then switched to mandolin, which he studied briefly under lifelong-friend David Grisman.

He learned to play R&B and jazz saxophone, for a time under the tutelage of Richard Grando, who played saxophone in Earth Opera. As a teenager Statman was already performing in public in Washington Square Park and with local string bands. In 1969 he attended Franconia College in Franconia, New Hampshire, but eventually dropped out to pursue a musical career.

He first gained acclaim as a mandolinist as a sideman with David Bromberg and Russ Barenberg, as well as in the pioneering bluegrass bands Country Cookin' and Breakfast Special.

During the course of exploring a wide range of roots and ethnic music, Statman turned to klezmer music, traditional Eastern European Jewish instrumental music. This led Statman, who grew up in a traditional but secular Jewish home, to reconnect with his Jewish roots.

Statman studied klezmer clarinet during the 1970s with legendary klezmer clarinetist Dave Tarras, who bequeathed several of his clarinets to him. Statman also produced Dave Tarras's last recording. As a clarinetist, he recorded several albums that were highly influential in the Klezmer revival of those years. Still forging ahead musically, he began playing Chassidic melodies, fusing bluegrass, klezmer, and jazz along the way. Given his apprenticeship with Tarras and his subsequent master classes at workshops such as KlezKamp as well as privately, Statman became a renowned exponent of traditional Jewish and avant-garde clarinet styles.

The Andy Statman Trio, which includes bassist Jim Whitney and percussionist Larry Eagle, plays regularly at Darech Amuno Synagogue in Greenwich Village in New York City, and tours nationally as schedules allow.

In 1983, he performed on the Antilles Records release Swingrass '83.

He has participated in a yearly klezmer concert series with Itzhak Perlman and other klezmer superstars.

In 2007, he was a Grammy Awards nominee in the Best Country Instrumental Performance category for his version of Bill Monroe's "Rawhide" on Shefa CD East Flatbush Blues.

In 2008, Statman appeared as a guest on the Bela Fleck and the Flecktones holiday album Jingle All the Way, playing both clarinet and mandolin. The album won Best Pop Instrumental Album at the 51st Annual Grammy Awards. He joined the group in concert on December 10 at the University at Buffalo, Center for the Arts, and December 16 at Philadelphia's Kimmel Center.

Old Brooklyn, a multi-artist recording project, was released in October 2011 on Shefa Records. This double CD features the American roots, R&B, Chassidic and other sides of his music, performed with his trio, Jim Whitney on bass and Larry Eagle on drums and percussion, along with fiddler Byron Berline and guitarist Jon Sholle. Guest artists include Ricky Skaggs, Béla Fleck, Paul Shaffer, Bruce Molsky, Art Baron, Marty Rifkin, Bob Jones, Lew Soloff, Kristen Muller and John Goodman. His next album was Superstring Theory, released in November 2013, which hosts fiddler Michael Cleveland and guitarist Tim O'Brien.

On June 19, 2012, the National Endowment for the Arts announced that Statman would be awarded a National Heritage Fellowship, the nation's highest honor in the folk and traditional arts. He performed with other recipients of this fellowship in Washington, DC, on October 4, 2012.

In recent years Statman has played an Aleyas F-5 and a Will Kimble F-5 mandolin, after having played an early 1920s Gibson A2Z for more than 35 years. He plays several Albert-system clarinets.

Personal information
Statman is married to the former Barbara Soloway, an artist and teacher. They have 4 children and 19 grandchildren.

Discography
 1979	Jewish Klezmer Music
 1980	Flatbush Waltz
 1983	Mandolin Abstractions - with David Grisman
 1985	New Acoustic Music
 1986	Nashville Mornings, New York Nights
 1988	Rounder Bluegrass, Vol. 2
 1992	Andy Statman Klezmer Orchestra
 1994	Klezmer Suite	
 1994	Andy's Ramble
 1995	Acoustic Disc: 100% Handmade Music, Vol. 2
 1995	Doyres (Generations): Traditional Klezmer Recordings, 1979-1994
 1995	Songs of Our Fathers - with David Grisman
 1995	Holding On: Dreamers, Visionaries, Eccentrics & Other American Heroes
 1996	American Fogies, Vol. 1
 1996	Blue Ribbon Fiddle
 1996	Klezmer Music: A Marriage of Heaven & Earth
 1996	Rounder Bluegrass Guitar
 1997	Between Heaven & Earth: Music of the Jewish Mystics
 1998	The Hidden Light
 1998	Holiday Tradition
 1998	The Soul of Klezmer
 2000	Klezmer: From Old World To Our World
 2001	Bluegrass Mountain Style
 2001	New York City: Global Beat of the Boroughs - Music From New York City's Ethnic.... 
 2004  Wisdom, Understanding, Knowledge
 2005	On Air
 2006  New Shabbos Waltz - with David Grisman
 2005	Avodas Halevi
 2006	East Flatbush Blues
 2006	Awakening from Above
 2011	Old Brooklyn
 2013  Superstring Theory
 2014  Hallel V'zimrah — Ben Zion Shenker, vocals
 2014  Songs of the Breslever Chassidim
 2018  Monroe Bus

Publications
Statman, Andrew, Teach Yourself Bluegrass Mandolin, Amsco Music Publishing Company, New York, 1978

References

External links

1950 births
Living people
American clarinetists
American folk musicians
American bluegrass musicians
Klezmer musicians
American mandolinists
Jewish American musicians
Tzadik Records artists
American Orthodox Jews
Baalei teshuva
American bluegrass mandolinists
National Heritage Fellowship winners
Musicians from New York City
Country musicians from New York (state)
21st-century clarinetists